Pilgrimage is the second studio album by the rock band Wishbone Ash. The album focuses more on folk and acoustic music as opposed to the blues rock sound that dominated the first album. The album also contains an instrumental jazz workout ("Vas Dis") and a four-part harmony vocal track in the spirit of Crosby, Stills, Nash, and Young ("Valediction").

The album sold well, reaching no. 14 in the UK Albums Chart, but the band reached their creative and commercial peak with their next studio release, Argus.

Track listing
All songs composed by Martin Turner, Steve Upton, Ted Turner and Andy Powell, except where noted.

Note: some issues incorrectly list "Alone" as being 2:55.

Personnel
Wishbone Ash
Andy Powell – guitar, vocals
Ted Turner – guitar, vocals
Martin Turner – bass, vocals
Steve Upton – drums

Charts

References

1971 albums
Albums produced by Derek Lawrence
Albums with cover art by Hipgnosis
Wishbone Ash albums
MCA Records albums